Yoo Won-sang (born June 17, 1986) is a South Korean professional baseball player for the KT Wiz of the KBO League. He is the son of former KBO catcher Yoo Seung-an, and the brother of fellow KBO player Yoo Min-sang.

Yoo Won-sang represented the South Korea national baseball team at the 2013 World Baseball Classic.

References

External links
 Career statistics and player information from Korea Baseball Organization 
 Career statistics and player information from MyKBOStats.com
Baseball America

KBO League pitchers
1986 births
Living people
South Korean baseball players
Hanwha Eagles players
LG Twins players
2013 World Baseball Classic players
Baseball players from Seoul
Asian Games medalists in baseball
Baseball players at the 2014 Asian Games
Medalists at the 2014 Asian Games
Asian Games gold medalists for South Korea